Axel Nicolás Ochoa (born 13 March 1996) is an Argentine professional footballer who plays as a left-back for Primera Nacional side Belgrano, on loan from Atlanta.

Career
Ochoa started his career in the youth ranks of Lanús, featuring for the club at the 2016 U-20 Copa Libertadores where he scored one goal (versus Liverpool) in four appearances as Lanús placed fourth. On 24 July 2017, Ochoa joined Primera B Metropolitana side Atlanta. He made his professional debut on 4 September during a match with Colegiales.

On 9 February 2021, Ochoa joined Belgrano on a one-year loan spell with a purchase option. In January 2022, the loan was extended with one more year.

Career statistics
.

References

External links

1996 births
Living people
Place of birth missing (living people)
Argentine footballers
Association football defenders
Primera B Metropolitana players
Club Atlético Atlanta footballers
Club Atlético Belgrano footballers